Events from 2010 in Catalonia.

Incumbents
 President of the Generalitat of Catalonia – José Montilla (until December 27), Artur Mas (since December 27)

Events
29 June – The Constitutional Court in Madrid rules that Catalonia is allowed to call itself a "nation" but without any legal effect, while it declared non valid some of the articles which increased the self-government.
10 July – More than a million people hold a march in Barcelona to call for greater autonomy for Catalonia.

See also

 2010 in Spain

References